The Brazilian yellow-toothed cavy (Galea flavidens) is a cavy species from South America. It is found in Brazil.

Galea flavidens is a yellow-toothed-cavy. G. flavidens lives in Brazil. This species is listed by the IUCN as Least Concern, in spite of the fact that there have been only few observations. Its habitat is widespread and the animal highly migratory, therefore there is no immediate threat to the population as a whole. As nearly with any other species, human expansion may become a problem in the near future. G. flavidens seem to be highly promiscuous, females mate regularly mate with multiple partners. In more than 90 percent of litters with more than one the littermates have more than one father.

References

Cavies
Mammals of Brazil
Mammals described in 1835